Michael Mills (born 11 November 1967) is a Nevisian cricketer. He played in one List A and two first-class matches for the Leeward Islands in 1996/97 and 2001/02.

See also
 List of Leeward Islands first-class cricketers

References

External links
 

1967 births
Living people
Nevisian cricketers
Leeward Islands cricketers